Park is an electoral ward of the Borough of Reading, in the English county of Berkshire. It takes its name from Palmer Park, which lies at its centre.

Park ward lies in the east of Reading. From the north in clockwise order it is bounded by the Reading to Waterloo railway line, Church Road, Whiteknights Road, Eastern Avenue, Kings Road, Rupert Street, and the River Kennet. Along the Whitekights Road section of the boundary, the ward is adjacent to the Whiteknights Campus of the University of Reading. The ward shares borders with Thames and Redlands wards of the Borough of Reading, and with the civil parish of Earley in the Borough of Wokingham.

As with all Reading wards, the ward elects three councillors to Reading Borough Council. Elections are generally held by thirds, with elections in three years out of four, although the 2022 elections were for all councillors due to the boundary changes. In the 1984 elections, the ward elected Martin Salter, who would go on to be the Labour MP for Reading West between 1997 and 2010, as councillor. For the next 16 years, Labour won every election in the ward bar one, but from the 2011 election onwards, the Green Party candidates have won. The ward councillors are currently Brenda McGonigle, Rob White and Josh Williams, all of whom are members of the Green Party.

Park ward includes 2 allotments (Mockbeggars and Bulmershe allotments), a library (Palmer Park Library), a sports center (Palmer Park Stadium and sports center) and Palmer Park.

References

Wards of Reading